Alexander Vasilyevich Kruglov was a Russian writer, poet, publicist, biographer and editor.

Born in Veliky Ustyug, he spent his childhood in Vologda and in 1873, having graduated from the Teachers' College there, moved to Saint Petersburg where he started to publish stories and poetry, to become in several years' time one of Russia's most popular children's authors. Among Kruglov's best-known books addressed to the young readership, were the collections of short stories, Follow Me, Children (1888), For the Little Ones (1898), Forget-Me-Nots (1900), as well as the novellas Ivan Ivanovich and His Company (1882), Bolshak (1883), From the Golden Years of Childhood (1889). His acclaimed biography of Mikhail Lomonosov, written while still in Vologda, at age 18, was later released as a book and enjoyed eight re-issues.

Kruglov's more serious works (Living Souls, 1885; On the Historical River, 1890 and others) were influenced by Fyodor Dostoyevsky, whom he considered to be his teacher. He is credited with being the first Russian author who wrote about the Komi peoples and the great hardships they were suffering at the time. Initially a narodnik, later in his life Kruglov became a conservative. In 1907—1914 he published and edited the magazine Dnevnik Pisatelya (Writer's Diary), a pro-monarchist publication.

References

External links
 The Works by Kruglov at Lib.ru

1852 births
1915 deaths
People from Veliky Ustyug
People from Velikoustyuzhsky Uyezd
Russian writers
Russian critics
Journalists from the Russian Empire
Russian male journalists
Male writers from the Russian Empire
Russian editors